This is a list of the mammal species recorded in the Cocos (Keeling) Islands, a small Indian Ocean archipelago approximately midway between Australia and Sri Lanka. There are two non-marine mammal species in the Cocos (Keeling) Islands, neither of which is believed to be threatened.

The following tags are used to highlight each species' conservation status as assessed by the International Union for Conservation of Nature:

Some species were assessed using an earlier set of criteria. Species assessed using this system have the following instead of near threatened and least concern categories:

Order: Chiroptera (bats) 
The bats' most distinguishing feature is that their forelimbs are developed as wings, making them the only mammals capable of flight. Bat species account for about 20% of all mammals.
 Family: Molossidae
 Genus: Chaerephon
 Wrinkle-lipped free-tailed bat, Chaerephon plicata LC
 Family: Vespertilionidae
 Subfamily: Vespertilioninae
 Genus: Pipistrellus
 Least pipistrelle, Pipistrellus tenuis LR/lc

Order: Cetacea (whales and dolphins and porpoises) 
The order Cetacea includes whales, dolphins and porpoises. They are the mammals most fully adapted to aquatic life with a spindle-shaped nearly hairless body, protected by a thick layer of blubber, and forelimbs and tail modified to provide propulsion underwater.
 Suborder: Mysticeti
 Family: Balaenopteridae
 Subfamily: Balaenopterinae
 Genus: Balaenoptera
 Omura's whale, Balaenoptera omurai (possible)DD
 Suborder: Odontoceti
 Superfamily: Platanistoidea
 Family: Ziphidae
 Subfamily: Hyperoodontinae
 Genus: Mesoplodon
 Blainville's beaked whale, Mesoplodon densirostris DD
 Family: Delphinidae (marine dolphins)
 Genus: Feresa
 Pygmy killer whale, Feresa attenuata DD

Order: Sirenia (sea cows) 
The dugong is not a native species to the Cocos (Keeling) Islands, however, a solitary animal started to inhabit the southern lagoon in 2002.
 Family: Dugongidae
 Subfamily: Dugonginae
 Genus: Dugong
 Dugong, D. dugon

Notes

References

See also 
 Fauna of the Cocos (Keeling) Islands
 List of mammals of Christmas Island
 List of chordate orders
 Lists of mammals by region
 List of prehistoric mammals
 Mammal classification
 List of mammals described in the 2000s

Cocos
Fauna of the Cocos (Keeling) Islands
Mammals
Cocos